Lee Jong-seop (born 30 October 1935) is a South Korean weightlifter. He competed at the 1960 Summer Olympics, the 1964 Summer Olympics and the 1968 Summer Olympics.

References

External links
 

1935 births
Living people
South Korean male weightlifters
Olympic weightlifters of South Korea
Weightlifters at the 1960 Summer Olympics
Weightlifters at the 1964 Summer Olympics
Weightlifters at the 1968 Summer Olympics
People from Geoje
Asian Games medalists in weightlifting
Asian Games gold medalists for South Korea
Weightlifters at the 1966 Asian Games
Medalists at the 1966 Asian Games
Sportspeople from South Gyeongsang Province
20th-century South Korean people
21st-century South Korean people